Michael D. Ryan (August 3, 1945 – January 30, 2012) was a justice of the Arizona Supreme Court, a position he had held 2002–2010. He was also a veteran of the Vietnam War.

Ryan announced in June 2010 that he was stepping down from the court effective August 6, 2010.
He died from a heart attack on January 30, 2012, at the age of 66.

Education
Born at Balboa Naval Hospital in San Diego, California, Ryan received a Bachelor of Arts from Saint John's University, in Minnesota in 1967. Ten years later, he earned a Juris Doctor from Arizona State University Law School (now Sandra Day O'Connor College of Law).

Military experience
After graduating from college, Ryan enrolled in the United States Marine Corps. While in the service, he served as a platoon commander and achieved a rank of First Lieutenant. As a result of wounds sustained in battle, Ryan received a Medical Retirement in February 1969. Accordingly, he was awarded two Purple Heart medals, in addition to a Bronze Star for actions in combat.

Professional career
After his discharge from the USMC, Ryan took a job in the Maricopa County Attorney's Office, as Deputy County Attorney. There he served in the Major Felony Bureau and held the position of co-coordinator of the county's sex crimes unit. He stayed at Maricopa Country Attorney's Office for eight years, starting in October 1977 and ending in October 1985.

After leaving the County Attorney's Office, Ryan served as a full-time judge pro tempore for the Maricopa County Superior Court, a position he held for a little over a year and a half, In June 1986, he was appointed a full-time judge by the Governor. He served on the court for ten years. For his last three years, he also acted as an Associate Criminal presiding judge. While a judge, Ryan presided over the criminal trial of former Governor Evan Mecham. Ryan was appointed on September 11, 1996, to the Arizona Court of Appeals by Fife Symington III.

Ryan was appointed to the state's highest court on May 21, 2002, by Governor Jane Dee Hull.

Awards and associations

 2005 State Bar of Arizona's James A. Walsh Outstanding Jurist Award
 2003 Arizona State University College of Law's Outstanding Alumnus Award
 2003 Arizona State University College of Law's Distinguished Achievement Award
 2001 Semper Fi award, Phoenix Chapter, First Marine Division Association
 2001 Judicial Award of Excellence for outstanding dedication and commitment to improving the justice system, State Bar of Arizona, Public Lawyers Section
 2001 Honorable Henry S. Stevens Judge of the Year Award for outstanding service to improve the legal system, legal profession and professionalism of the bench and bar, Maricopa County Bar Association
 1999–2000 Board of Directors’ Member of the Year, Maricopa County Bar Association

References

External links

 Arizona Supreme Court
 The Free Library by Farlex, "Arizona A+: State Supreme Court flunks voucher subsidies for religious and other private schools"

1945 births
2012 deaths
20th-century American judges
American people with disabilities
College of Saint Benedict and Saint John's University alumni
Justices of the Arizona Supreme Court
Sandra Day O'Connor College of Law alumni
United States Marine Corps officers
United States Marine Corps personnel of the Vietnam War